The 2014 FINA Women's Water Polo World League is played between November 2013 and June 2014 and open to all women's water polo national teams. After participating in a preliminary round, eight teams qualify to play in a final tournament, called the Super Final in Kunshan, China from 10–15 June 2014.

In the World League, there are specific rules that do not allow matches to end in a draw.  If teams are level at the end of the 4th quarter of any world league match, the match will be decided by a penalty shootout. Teams earn points in the standings in group matches as follows:
 Match won in normal time - 3 points
 Match won in shootout - 2 points
 Match lost in shootout - 1 point
 Match lost in normal time - 0 points

Preliminary round

Europe
The European preliminary round consisted of two group of three teams. The winner of each group after the home and away series of games and the best 2nd placed team qualified for the Super Final. The games were played between 19 November 2013 and 22 April 2014.

Group A

Group B

Intercontinental
The intercontinental tournament will feature teams from Africa, the Americas, Asia and Oceania. The teams are split into two groups, one with four teams and another group with five teams. The top four teams from this tournament will qualify for the Super Final, along with the Super Final hosts China. The games were played between 20 and 25 May in Riverside, California, United States.

Group A

Group B

Knockout stage

Quarterfinals

Semifinals

7th-place play-off

5th-place play-off

3rd-place play-off

Final

Super Final
In the Super Final the eight qualifying teams are split into two groups of four teams with all teams progressing to the knock-out stage.

Group A

Group B

Knockout stage

Quarterfinals

Semifinals

7th-place play-off

5th-place play-off

3rd-place play-off

Final

Final ranking 

Team Roster
Sami Hill, Alys Williams, Melissa Seidemann, Rachel Fattal, Caroline Clark, Maggie Steffens (C), Makenzie Fischer, Kiley Neushul, Jillian Kraus, Kaleigh Gilchrist, Annika Dries, Kami Craig, Elizabeth Keeve. Head coach: Adam Krikorian.

References

World League, women
FINA Women's Water Polo World League
International water polo competitions hosted by China